Roger G. Weill (June 12, 1909 – March 2, 1991), of New Orleans, was a stamp dealer who sold some of the world's greatest philatelic rarities.

Philatelic activity
Roger and his brother Raymond and their father Fernand formed the Raymond H. Weill Company in 1932. For the next sixty years, the firm became world famous for being accorded the honor of selling some of the world's most rare and treasured postage stamps.

Weill acquired and sold rare postage stamps and covers of the United States and foreign countries. He drew the attention of the philatelic world in 1968 when he paid the sum of $380,000 for the famous “Mauritius Post Office” cover (envelope with cancelled stamps) which was the highest price ever paid up to that time for a philatelic item of any kind.

Honors and awards
The Philatelic Foundation awarded Weill the Mortimer Neinken Medal in 1988, and, in 1992, Weill was elevated to the American Philatelic Society Hall of Fame.

See also
 Philately
 Philatelic literature

References
 New York Times obituary for Weill
 Roger G. Weill

1909 births
1991 deaths
American stamp dealers
American philatelists
People from New Orleans
20th-century American businesspeople
American Philatelic Society